Janus Mats Drachmann (born 11 May 1988) is a Danish professional footballer who plays as a midfielder for Danish Superliga side AC Horsens.

Born in Frederikssund, Drachmann emerged from the AC Horsens academy in 2006, and grew into a key player in midfield for the club, as well as the team captain. He since played for SønderjyskE and Midtjylland, before signing with OB in 2018.

Drachmann is a youth international for Denmark, having gained caps for the under-20 and under-21 sides.

Club career

Horsens
Drachmann came to AC Horsens as an 18-year-old in the summer of 2006, to complete his education, and at the same time develop as a player on the club's reserve team. Due to injury to teammate and Horsens star player Allan Søgaard, Drachmann grabbed the opportunity to be the starting defensive midfielder for the club during the 2007–08 Superliga season. Despite his young age he showed himself capable of playing at the highest level. During the next nine years, Drachmann made 171 league appearances for the club, in which he scored four goals, and grew into team captain.

SønderjyskE
Drachmann signed a two-year contract with SønderjyskE on 5 June 2015. He played there for two seasons, in which he made 44 league appearances and scored one goal.

Midtjylland
On 4 January 2017, was first announced that Drachmann would move to Midtjylland after the ongoing season, but on 29 January, he was set to move to the club Midtjylland immediately. He made his debut for the club on 7 March 2017 in a match against the third tier club Kjellerup IF in the Danish Cup, which Midtjylland won 3–0 with goals by Bruninho, Mikkel Duelund and Simon Kroon. He made his Superliga debut for the club on 19 March, when he started against Nordsjælland; a match which Midtjylland lost 1–2. He played a total of nine matches in his first half of the season at the club, all of which were from the start. However, he did not play the full 90 minutes against SønderjyskE and Nordsjælland, as he was replaced in the 75th minute for Gustav Wikheim (5–2 defeat away) and was sent off in the 73rd minute after two yellow cards (2–3 win away) by referee Mads-Kristoffer Kristoffersen.

OB
On 18 July 2018, it was announced that Drachmann had been signed by OB. He penned a four-year agreement, where he was also reunited with head coach Jakob Michelsen, who he had as coach at SønderjyskE. He already made his debut four days later when he started and played every 90 minutes in a 2–2 home draw against SønderjyskE.

Return to Horsens
Drachmann returned to Horsens on 11 June 2021, after the club had just suffered relegation to the second-tier Danish 1st Division. He helped the club return to the Superliga within one season, captaining the team and making 23 league appearances.

International career
In October 2007, Drachmann was selected for his first matches with the Denmark under-21 team. He has also appeared for the under-20 team.

Honours
Midtjylland
 Danish Superliga: 2017–18

Horsens
 Danish 1st Division: 2021–22

References

External links
Career statistics at Danmarks Radio 

1988 births
Living people
People from Frederikssund Municipality
Danish men's footballers
Association football midfielders
Denmark under-21 international footballers
Danish Superliga players
Danish 1st Division players
AC Horsens players
SønderjyskE Fodbold players
FC Midtjylland players
Odense Boldklub players
Denmark youth international footballers
FC Nordsjælland players
FC Djursland players
Frederikssund IK players
Sportspeople from the Capital Region of Denmark
Danish people of German descent